Clarkston Community Schools is a school district headquartered in Independence Township, Michigan.  It was formed in 1952.

For a time in the early 2010s, Clarkston Community Schools' enrollment declined, but unlike other school districts, they did not close any schools.  In 2014, enrollment was 8,282 students.

In 2020 Sashabaw Middle School had 1157 students. In 2016 Clarkston High School had 1,930 students.

Schools

Secondary schools
Sashabaw Middle School
Clarkston Junior High School
Clarkston High School

Elementary schools
Andersonville Elementary School 
Bailey Lake Elementary School
Clarkston Elementary School
Independence Elementary School
North Sashabaw Elementary School
Pine Knob Elementary School
Springfield Plains Elementary School

Alternative schools
 Renaissance High School

Early childhood center
 Early Childhood Center

External links
 Clarkston Community Schools

School districts in Michigan
Education in Oakland County, Michigan
School districts established in 1952
1952 establishments in Michigan